Chiac (or Chiak, Chi’aq), is a variety of Acadian French spoken mostly in southeastern New Brunswick, Canada. Chiac is often characterized and distinguished from other forms of Acadian French by its borrowings from English, and is thus often mistakenly considered a form of Franglais. The word "Chiac" can also sometimes be used to describe an ethnic Acadian of rural southeastern New Brunswick.

Characteristics
As a major modern day variety of the Acadian-French language, Chiac shares most phonological particularities of the dialect. However, Chiac contains far more English loanwords compared to other Canadian French dialects. Many of its words also have roots in the Eastern Algonquian languages, most notably Mi'kmaq. These loanwords generally follow French conjugation patterns; "j'ai watché la tv" uses the English derived loanword "watch" as if it were an -er verb. The most common loans are basic lexical features (nouns, adjectives, verb stems), though there are a couple conjunctions and adverbs borrowed from English (but, so, anyway).

History
Chiac originated in the community of specific ethnic Acadians, known as "Chiacs, Chiaks or Chi'aq", living on the southeast coast of New Brunswick. 

While some believe that Chiac dates back as far as the 17th or 18th century, others believe it developed in the 20th century, in reaction to the dominance of English-language media in Canada, the lack of French-language primary and secondary education, the increased urbanization of Moncton, and contact with the dominant Anglophone community in the area. The origin of the word "Chiac" is not known; some speculate that it is an alteration of "Shediac" or "Es-ed-ei-ik".

Geographic distribution
Chiac is mostly spoken by native Acadian French speakers in the southeast region of New Brunswick. Its speakers are primarily located in the Shediac region. Further north along the coast, Acadian French resembling Quebecois French is more common as one approaches the border with Quebec. To the immediate east, west and south, fully bilingual speakers of French and English are found, and beyond are typically unilingual Anglophones.

In culture
Acadian writers, poets and musicians such as Lisa LeBlanc, Radio Radio, Fayo, Cayouche, Les Hay Babies, 1755 
and many others have produced works in Chiac.

Chiac is also featured in Acadieman, a comedy about "The world's first Acadian Superhero" by Dano Leblanc.

References

Further reading 
 King, Ruth. "Overview and Evaluation of Acadie's joual," in  Social Lives in Language – Sociolinguistics and multilingual speech communities: Celebrating the Work of Gillian Sankoff edited by Miriam Meyerhoff and Naomi Nagy (2008)  pp 137ff
 Chiac: an example of dialect change and language transfer in Acadian French. National Library of Canada, 1987.

See also 
Michif
Louisiana Creole
Acadian French
French language
Shediac
Assimilation 
Acadian Exodus
Pidgin
Louisiana Creole people
Caló (Chicano)

External links 
 The Chiac verb particle construction – A linguistics paper (beginning on page 56 of the pdf document) examining certain features of Chiac grammar.
 Sang Mêlé

French language
Acadian French
Canadian French
Acadian culture
Acadia